Marites Burce is a Filipino para-athlete who competed at the 2012 Summer Paralympics in London. She uses a wheelchair due to her disability which was caused by polio. She competes in discus throw, javelin throw and shot put under the F54 classification. She also took part in the 2011 ASEAN Paragames where she won two gold medals.

Burce first took up para-track and field in 2005 in Manila. She start representing the Philippines internationally three years later.

Burce took her studies at the Trinity University of Asia in Quezon City. She also worked for the Tahanang Walang Hagdanan in Rizal, a foundation for the disabled, as a teacher and later as a project coordinator.

References

 

Paralympic track and field athletes of the Philippines
Athletes (track and field) at the 2012 Summer Paralympics
Year of birth missing (living people)
Living people
Filipino javelin throwers